Mount Shank is a mountain located in the Catskill Mountains of New York northwest of Cobleskill. Hogback is located northeast, and Donats Mountain is located southeast of Mount Shank.

References

Mountains of New York (state)
Mountains of Schoharie County, New York